Thomas Randolph may refer to:

 Thomas Randolph (ambassador) (1523–1590), English diplomat and politician
 Thomas Randolph (poet) (1605–1635), English poet and dramatist
 Thomas Randolph of Tuckahoe (1683–1729), Virginia politician
 Thomas Randolph (academic) (1701–1783), Vice-Chancellor of Oxford University
 Thomas Randolph, 1st Earl of Moray (died 1332), nephew and companion-in-arms of King Robert the Bruce
 Thomas Randolph, 2nd Earl of Moray (died 1332), son of the 1st Earl of Moray
 Thomas Mann Randolph Jr. (1768–1828), Representative from Virginia
 Thomas Jefferson Randolph (1792–1875), served in the Virginia House of Delegates
 Thomas Randolph (American football) (born 1970), American football player
 Thomas Randolph (priest) (1904–1987), Archdeacon of Hereford
 Thomas Beverly Randolph (1793–1867), American military officer
 Thomas Mann Randolph Sr. (1741–1793), politician in Virginia